The Oakland Athletics' 1993 season was the team's 26th in Oakland, California. It was also the 93rd season in franchise history. The team finished seventh and last in the American League West with a record of 68-94.

The Athletics' disastrous 1993 campaign was mired by inconsistency, injuries, and free agent departures. The team lost key contributors Dave Stewart, Harold Baines, and Mike Moore to free agency; the players ended up (respectively) in Toronto, Chicago, and Detroit. The A's also traded Walt Weiss to the expansion Florida Marlins for Scott Baker and Eric Helfand. The Athletics' roster was further weakened by the retirement of longtime third baseman Carney Lansford.

The team's depleted pitching staff was no match for its American League (AL) competition. The Athletics, following a resurgent 1992 campaign, finished 1993 with a team ERA of 4.90; this was the worst such figure in the AL. The futility of Oakland's new-look starting rotation was especially noteworthy; of the team's five primary starters (Bobby Witt, Ron Darling, Bob Welch, Todd Van Poppel, and Shawn Hillegas), only one (Witt) managed a sub-5.00 ERA. On offense, the Athletics also struggled; the loss of their two best players (Mark McGwire and Rickey Henderson) to injury and a trade, respectively, contributed to their scoring only 715 runs (10th of 14 AL teams).

The Athletics' 68-94 finish was their worst since 1982. Moreover, the 1993 Athletics (as of 2020) remain the only team in Oakland history to finish last in the AL West after finishing first one-year earlier.

Offseason
 October 27, 1992: Jamie Quirk was released by the Athletics.
 November 17, 1992: Walt Weiss was traded by the Athletics to the Florida Marlins for Eric Helfand and a player to be named later. The Marlins completed the deal by sending Scott Baker to the Athletics on November 20.
 December 7, 1992: Rich Gossage was signed as a free agent by the Athletics.
 December 17, 1992: Ron Darling was signed as a free agent by the Athletics.
 January 21, 1993: Joe Boever was signed as a free agent by the Athletics.
 January 21, 1993: Dale Sveum was signed as a free agent by the Athletics.
 March 27, 1993: Mike Aldrete was signed as a free agent by the Athletics.

Regular season

Season standings

Record vs. opponents

Notable transactions
 June 3, 1993: 1993 Major League Baseball draft
Jeff D'Amico was drafted by the Athletics in the 2nd round.
Jason McDonald was drafted by the Athletics in the 4th round. Player signed July 27, 1993.
Scott Spiezio was drafted by the Athletics in the 6th round. Player signed June 24, 1993.
 June 17, 1993: Dale Sveum was released by the Athletics.
 July 17, 1993: Miguel Tejada was signed by the Athletics as an amateur free agent.
 July 31, 1993: Rickey Henderson was traded by the Athletics to the Toronto Blue Jays for Steve Karsay and a player to be named later. The Blue Jays completed the deal by sending José Herrera to the Athletics on August 6.
 August 15, 1993: Joe Boever was released by the Athletics.

Roster

Player stats

Batting

Starters by position
Note: Pos = Position; G = Games played; AB = At bats; H = Hits; Avg. = Batting average; HR = Home runs; RBI = Runs batted in

Other batters
Note: G = Games played; AB = At bats; H = Hits; Avg. = Batting average; HR = Home runs; RBI = Runs batted in

Pitching

Starting pitchers 
Note: G = Games pitched; IP = Innings pitched; W = Wins; L = Losses; ERA = Earned run average; SO = Strikeouts

Other pitchers 
Note: G = Games pitched; IP = Innings pitched; W = Wins; L = Losses; ERA = Earned run average; SO = Strikeouts

Relief pitchers 
Note: G = Games pitched; W = Wins; L = Losses; SV = Saves; ERA = Earned run average; SO = Strikeouts

Farm system 

LEAGUE CHAMPIONS: AZL Athletics

References

1993 Oakland Athletics at Baseball Reference
1993 Oakland Athletics at Baseball Almanac

Oakland Athletics seasons
Oak